Ruhubelent District (Рухубелент этрабы) is a district of Daşoguz Province, Turkmenistan. The administrative center of the district is the town of Ruhubelent. The district was established April 2007 and the town of Ruhubelent was founded on 17 October 2008.

The "virgin district" was formed on 400 thousand hectares of the Shasenem Prairie specifically for cultivation of wheat, cotton, and pasturage. Şabat Open Joint Stock Company operates a dairy farm in Ruhubelent District.

Transportation
The district is served by the Trans-Karakum Railway that connects Ashgabat and Daşoguz as well as the Ashgabat-Dashoguz Automobile Highway.

References

Districts of Turkmenistan
Daşoguz Region